The 2020 WNBL Finals was the postseason tournament of the WNBL's 2020 season. The Canberra Capitals were the two-time defending champions, but were defeated in the semi-finals by Melbourne. The Southside Flyers won the Grand Final, defeating the Townsville Fire, 99–82. The Flyers took home the franchise's fourth WNBL title overall, this being their first since rebranding as Southside.

Due to the COVID-19 pandemic, a condensed season was held in a North Queensland hub. The season was originally 2020–21 and would be traditionally played over several months across the summer, however this season's scheduling has been amended. The six-week season saw Townsville, Cairns and Mackay host a 52-game regular season fixture, plus a four game Finals series (2 x semi-finals, preliminary final and grand final). The WNBL Finals series schedule and ticketing details were announced 5 December 2020.

Standings

Bracket

Semi-finals

(1) Southside Flyers vs. (2) Townsville Fire

(3) Canberra Capitals  vs. (4) Melbourne Boomers

Preliminary Final

(2) Townsville Fire vs. (4) Melbourne Boomers

Grand Final

(1) Southside Flyers vs. (2) Townsville Fire

Rosters

References 

Women's National Basketball League Finals
Finals